Vladimír Goffa (born 1 December 1959) is a former football player from Slovakia and currently assistant manager of Podbeskidzie, who coached FK Bodva Moldava nad Bodvou, Baník Prievidza, ŠK Slovan Bratislava and other Slovak football teams. Goffa won two titles with the Maldivian football club New Radiant SC.

In March 2021, Goffa was seriously affected by COVID-19 and had to be hospitalised.

Honours

Manager
Hurriyya SC
Dhivehi League (1): 2005
New Radiant S.C.
Dhivehi League (1): 2006

References 

Czechoslovak footballers
Slovak football managers
Living people
1959 births
Association football midfielders
MŠK Žilina players
FK Dukla Banská Bystrica players
MŠK Fomat Martin players
FK Dubnica managers
MŠK Žilina managers
MFK Tatran Liptovský Mikuláš managers
FK Slovan Duslo Šaľa managers
FK Frýdek-Místek managers
FC Petržalka managers
ŠK Slovan Bratislava managers
Czechoslovak expatriate sportspeople in Austria
Expatriate sportspeople in Austria
Slovak expatriate sportspeople in the Maldives
Expatriate football managers in the Maldives
Slovak expatriate sportspeople in the Czech Republic
Expatriate football managers in the Czech Republic
People from Vranov nad Topľou
Sportspeople from the Prešov Region